Butler Range may refer to:

 Butler Range (Canada), British Columbia, Canada
 Butler Range (Canterbury), South Island, New Zealand
 Butler Range (West Coast), South Island, New Zealand